Kimoa is a Spanish clothing and accessories retailer. The brand was founded by Spanish Formula One driver Fernando Alonso, who is also the current ambassador of the brand. The origins of the word Kimoa can be found in the Hawaiian language and it relates to
"sitting and watching the sun going down together". Kimoa is a clothing brand that would match each of the co-founders' unique lifestyles; because they love California, the beach and sunsets with friends, according to Alonso.

Kimoa targets young and middle-aged adults, with Kimoa serving 150 countries across the world via their e-store, with at least one physical store located in Spain. The brand serves products including shirts, swimsuits, sweaters, shoes, sunglasses and hats.

Kimoa was sold to US group Revolution Brands at August 2021 due to losses amounting to €3 million. Alonso continues to serve as the brand ambassador.

Development 
Kimoa was founded by Spanish Formula One racing driver Fernando Alonso along with a group of friends. The project was worked on for a few years, with ideas originating from creating a restaurant, a chiringuito and a beach attraction. Kimoa was finally established in March 2017 as a clothing and accessories retail brand, officially launching online with their e-store.

Spanish artist Domingo Zapata has also been included in Kimoa's works, even creating a line of his own in the brand, dubbed "Kimoa by Zapata". Spanish model Jessica Goicoechea and Italian model Linda Morselli have also been involved in the brand's works.

Bravers 
Bravers is a community organized by Kimoa, which includes people who look for new adventures and are firm believers in thinking they are capable of everything. Joining the community also allows members to be part of the brand's image and will also have access to Kimoa privileges.

Controversy 

In June 2020, Kimoa released a clothing line which it claimed was a tribute to Māori culture. In photos on Kimoa's website two models pose in t-shirts with their faces painted in an approximation of tā moko.
The company had not approached Māori or included them in any stage of its design process. The line received several negative reactions on Facebook.
Kimoa has removed the photos from their website and Facebook.

Motorsport 
Kimoa became an official partner of McLaren F1 Team for the 2018 Formula One season. Kimoa's branding was featured on the team's MCL33 car, driver suits and helmets. It was also displayed on Alonso's personal team kit and driver cap.

The Kimoa logo was also seen on Alonso's race apparels in his post-McLaren race events.

See also 

 Fernando Alonso
 Domingo Zapata
 McLaren
 Formula One

References

External links 
 Official website

Fernando Alonso
Clothing retailers of Spain